New Moon Shine is the thirteenth studio album by singer-songwriter James Taylor released in 1991. The album peaked at number 37 on the Billboard 200 chart and certified platinum. The album was producer-pianist Don Grolnick's sixth and final studio album with Taylor prior to his death in 1996 at age 48 from Non-Hodgkin lymphoma.

Reception

The album received generally positive reviews; The New York Times’s Stephen Holden observed that New Moon Shine "finds [Taylor] near the top of his form in songs like 'Slap Leather,' a playfully pungent rock-and-roll critique of social and environmental ills, and 'Copperline,' a nostalgic ballad remembering his North Carolina roots." 

Fairport Convention covered "The Frozen Man" on their album Old New Borrowed Blue.

Track listing
All songs written by James Taylor unless otherwise noted.

"Copperline" (Reynolds Price, Taylor) – 4:22
"Down in the Hole" – 5:15
"(I've Got to) Stop Thinkin' 'Bout That" (Danny Kortchmar, Taylor) – 4:00
"Shed a Little Light" – 3:52
"The Frozen Man" – 3:54
"Slap Leather" – 2:00
"Like Everyone She Knows" – 4:56
"One More Go Round" – 4:40
"Everybody Loves to Cha Cha Cha" (Sam Cooke) – 3:37
"Native Son" – 3:49
"Oh, Brother" – 4:24
"The Water Is Wide" (Traditional) – 3:00

Personnel 
 James Taylor – lead vocals, acoustic guitar (1-3, 5–12), arrangements (12)
 Don Grolnick – acoustic piano, organ, synthesizers, arrangements (12)
 Clifford Carter – synthesizers, synthesizer programming
 Dan Stein – synthesizer programming (3, 5)
 Danny Kortchmar – acoustic guitar (3, 5)
 Michael Landau – electric guitars
 Jerry Douglas – dobro
 Jimmy Johnson – bass guitar (1–8, 10–12)
 Tony Levin – bass guitar (9)
 Carlos Vega – drums (1, 2, 4, 6–8, 10–12)
 Steve Jordan – drums (3, 5)
 Steve Gadd – drums (9)
 Don Alias – percussion
 Mark O'Connor – violin
 Bob Mintzer – tenor saxophone (3)
 Branford Marsalis – soprano saxophone (7)
 Michael Brecker – tenor saxophone (8, 9)
 Dave Bargeron – trombone (3)
 Randy Brecker – trumpet (3)
 Valerie Carter – backing vocals
 David Lasley – backing vocals
 Kate Markowitz – backing vocals
 Arnold McCuller – backing vocals
 Phillip Ballou – backing vocals (10)

Production 
 Producers – Don Grolnick (all tracks); Danny Kortchmar (Tracks 3 & 5).
 Production Coordinator – Peter Stiglin
 Recorded and Mixed by James Farber
 Assistant Engineers – John Aguto, Patrick Dillett, Rob Jazco, Nathaniel Kunkel, Matthew Lamonica and Katherine Miller.
 Mix Assistant – Katherine Miller
 Recorded at The Power Station and Skyline Studios (New York, NY); A&M Studios (Hollywood, CA); Studio F (Los Angeles, CA).
 Mixed at Skyline Studios
 Mastered by Greg Calbi at Sterling Sound (New York, NY).
 Art Direction – Arnold Levine
 Design Assistants – Stefanie Dash, Lisa Sparagano and Marcus Wyns.
 Photography – Lee Crum

References

1991 albums
James Taylor albums
Albums produced by Danny Kortchmar
Columbia Records albums